John William Beattie (born 21 November 1985) is a Scottish former rugby union player. A number 8, he played for Glasgow Warriors, Montpellier, Castres and Bayonne.

Background

Beattie is the son of former Scotland number 8 John Beattie and brother of Scotland women's footballer Jen Beattie. He was educated at The Glasgow Academy, and played age group rugby for Glasgow and Scotland. As a youth, Beattie also represented Scotland at cricket and played football for the Rangers youth team.

International career
Beattie gained his first cap against Romania on 18 November 2006.

He was named in the XV for the standout performers of the 2010 Six Nations Championship by Planet Rugby.

He won 38 caps in total scoring 3 tries.

In January 2020, Beattie announced his retirement from rugby.

Post-retirement 
Beattie hosts Le French Rugby Podcast, a rugby podcast about French rugby with Benjamin Kayser. Beattie also works with the well known rugby publisher RugbyPass.

References

External links
John Beattie Glasgow Warriors
John Beattie Scotland Rugby

1985 births
Living people
Rugby union players from Glasgow
Scottish rugby union players
People educated at the Glasgow Academy
Glasgow Warriors players
Scotland international rugby union players
Aberdeen GSFP RFC players
Montpellier Hérault Rugby players
Castres Olympique players
Rugby union number eights
Scottish expatriate rugby union players
Expatriate rugby union players in France
Scottish expatriate sportspeople in France